ActiveVOS is a business process management suite. Business processes are designed using the graphical BPMN 2.0 notation. The process engine implements the WS-BPEL 2.0 standard as well as BPEL4People for processes that require people to perform tasks from a task list.

References

External links
 Product page

Middleware
Workflow applications